George Winne Jr. (April 2, 1947 – May 11, 1970) was an American student who, in protest of the United States' involvement in the Vietnam War, set himself on fire in an act of self-immolation at Revelle Plaza on the campus of the University of California, San Diego. Winne's act was inspired by the self-immolation of Buddhist monk Thích Quảng Đức in 1963 in response to the persecution of Buddhists by the regime of minority Catholic President Ngo Dinh Diem.

Death
Slightly after 4pm on Sunday, May 10 George Winne lit gasoline soaked rags on his body in Revelle Plaza on the UCSD campus and began running, carrying a sign reading "In God's name, End this war."  Graduate student Keith Stowe knocked him down and then Stowe and others smothered the flames with their jackets.  Winne suffered third and fourth degree burns over 95 percent of his body, and he died at Scripps Hospital at 2am on the 11th of May, 1970.

At noon on May 11, a memorial service was held in Revelle Plaza.  Speakers included history professor and chair of the faculty senate Gabriel Jackson and philosophy professor Herbert Marcuse.

Memorials

In 2013, a group of students studying the history of progressive activism at UC San Diego, proposed a "memory site" near the location of Winne's act. Rather than focusing on his individual act, the memorial remembered all those who fought for peace during the American war in Vietnam as well as all those who struggle for peace today. With input and support from Winne's cousin, Keith Stowe, and others, the site was completed in 2014.

A small plaque was also installed on the ground near the memorial, which reads "In honor of George Winne Jr. Who immolated himself in Revelle Plaza in protest of the Vietnam war in 1970. He held a sign that read 'In the name of God, end the war'".

See also 

 Norman Morrison
 Alice Herz
 Florence Beaumont
 Roger Allen LaPorte
 Self-immolations in protest to the Vietnam War

References 

 Keen, H. "San Diego student who set self afire in war protest dies", Los Angeles Times, May 12, 1970
 Joyner, Owen. "Student Sets Self Afire; Dies to Protest War," UCSD Triton Times, May 12, 1970

External links 
 Images Of War - Bricks from the site of Winne's immolation
 Social Architectures – Memorial to George Winne Jr.

1947 births
1970 suicides
Self-immolations in protest of the Vietnam War
American anti–Vietnam War activists
Suicides in California
Deaths from fire in the United States
University of California, San Diego people
Activists from Detroit